Shahrul Anuar Zain (born 15 February 1970) is a Malaysian singer and artist. He has had five albums released, all of which have been named after him. The first album was released in 1998, consisting of 10 songs. His first single after a hiatus was "Bila Resah". The second album was released in 2002 while the third was released in 2007. His most recent albums came out in 2011 and 2016.

Personal life
Born in Merlimau, Malacca, Anuar is the second child out of 5 siblings, one of them is his older sister, fellow artist Ziana Zain.

Anuar is not married and has no children, making him the only person in his five siblings who is unmarried.

Discography 
To date, Anuar Zain has produce five studio albums which all of them bearing his name as an album title.

 Anuar Zain I (1998)
 Anuar Zain II (2002)
 Anuar Zain III (2007)
 Anuar Zain IV (2011)
 Anuar Zain V (2016)
In 2021, he came out with a new single titled "Sendiri" which then became an original soundtrack to the hit drama series, Single Terlalu Lama

Filmography

Film

Television series

References

External links
 
 

Living people
1970 births
People from Malacca
Malaysian rhythm and blues singers
Malay-language singers
Malaysian male pop singers